Pavel Yevgenyevich Smeyan (born 23 April 1957, Moscow, Russia – died 13 July 2009) was a Russian singer and actor. He died of cancer in a hospital in Germany at age of 52.

He graduated from the Gnesins' State Institute of Music majoring in the saxophone. He played in various philharmonics, and worked in Rosconcert and the Lenkom Theatre. He dubbed and played roles and recorded songs for more than 20 movies and animations including Mary Poppins, Goodbye, Weather Is Good on Deribasovskaya, It Rains Again on Brighton Beach. He sang in the famous rock operas The Star and Death of Joaquin Murrieta, Juno and Avos. His first songs were first recorded on releases of the  band in 1981. Later the songwriter released three music albums.

References

1957 births
2009 deaths
Deaths from cancer in Germany
Russian male actors
Soviet male singers
Soviet male actors
Soviet male poets
Russian male poets
20th-century Russian poets
Deaths from pancreatic cancer
20th-century Russian male singers
20th-century Russian singers